The Garden of Lies is a lost 1915 silent film drama directed by Jack Pratt and starring in her debut stage actress Jane Cowl. It was based on a novel by Justus Miles Forman who perished on the Lusitania that same year. The Universal Film Manufacturing Company handled the distribution.

The film was shot in Jacksonville, Florida, St. Augustine, Florida, parts of Louisiana, and other areas around the Gulf of Mexico.

Cast
Jane Cowl - Eleanor Mannering/Princess Eleanor
William Russell - Dennis Mallory
Philip Hahn - Prince Carl
Violet Horner - Jessica Mannering
Ethelbert Hale - Von Aldorz
David Wall - Dr. Mackenzie
Claude Cooper - Baron Von Steinbreck
Adele Carson - The Maid

References

External links
 The Garden of Lies @ IMDb.com

a reprint of the book after the film came out with Jane Cowl's likeness on the cover

1915 films
American silent feature films
Universal Pictures films
Lost American films
American black-and-white films
Silent American drama films
1915 drama films
Films directed by Jack Pratt
1910s American films